Carlos Iván Rosel Bermont (born 31 August 1995), also known as El Chivo, is a Mexican professional footballer who plays as a winger.

Honours
América
CONCACAF Champions League: 2015–16

References

1995 births
Living people
Mexican footballers
Association football midfielders
Club América footballers
Atlante F.C. footballers
Alebrijes de Oaxaca players
Club Celaya footballers
FC Juárez footballers
Liga MX players
Ascenso MX players
Liga Premier de México players
Sportspeople from Mérida, Yucatán
Footballers from Yucatán